"As Long as I'm Rockin' with You" is a song written by Bruce Channel and Kieran Kane, and recorded by American country music artist John Conlee.  It was released in February 1984 as the third single from the album In My Eyes.  The song was Conlee's sixth number one on the country chart.  The single went to number one for one week and spent twelve weeks on the country chart.

Charts

Weekly charts

Year-end charts

References

1984 singles
John Conlee songs
Songs written by Kieran Kane
MCA Records singles
Songs written by Bruce Channel
1984 songs